Martín Pino (born 16 March 1998) is an Argentine professional footballer who plays as a forward for Gimnasia y Tiro, on loan from Instituto.

Career
Villa Azalais was a club where Pino spent the majority of his youth years, prior to moving to Instituto in 2015. His senior career got underway with the latter. He made nine appearances, all of which were as a substitute, in Primera B Nacional throughout 2017–18, with his debut falling on 11 December 2017 in a 3–0 defeat at the Estadio Eva Perón against Sarmiento. In June 2022, Pino was loaned out to Gimnasia y Tiro for the rest of the year.

Career statistics
.

References

External links

1998 births
Living people
Footballers from Córdoba, Argentina
Argentine footballers
Association football forwards
Primera Nacional players
Instituto footballers
Gimnasia y Tiro footballers